The 2017–18 Oakland Golden Grizzlies men's basketball team represented Oakland University (OU) during the 2017–18 NCAA Division I men's basketball season. The Golden Grizzlies were led by 34th-year head coach Greg Kampe and played their home games at the Athletics Center O'rena in Rochester, Michigan as members of the Horizon League.

Oakland made a three-point field goal in every game of the season, increasing their steak to 937 consecutive games, the eighth-longest active NCAA Division I streak (at the time). They last finished a game without a three-pointer on January 30, 1988.

Previous season
The Golden Grizzlies finished the 2016–17 season 25–9, 14–4 in Horizon League play to win a share for the Horizon League regular season championship. As the No. 1 seed in the Horizon League tournament, they were upset in the quarterfinals by Youngstown State. As a conference champion and No. 1 seed who failed to win their conference tournament, they received an automatic bid to the National Invitation Tournament where they defeated Clemson in the first round before losing to Richmond in the second round.

Off-season

Roster changes
The Golden Grizzlies lost Sherron Dorsey-Walker, a guard on the 2016–17 team, to graduation. Prior to the season, sophomore Isaiah Brock unexpectedly decided to leave the team. Brock was named to the Horizon League's All-Defensive Team and All-Freshman Team. Senior guard Stevie Clark also left the team, transferring to Louisiana State University in Shreveport.

2017 recruiting class

Preseason polls

Oakland was picked by coaches, media and sports information directors to finish first the Horizon League. Oakland received 31 of the 47 votes for first place ahead of second place Northern Kentucky. The adjacent table shows the complete preseason poll. Seniors Jalen Hayes and Martez Walker were selected to the preseason first team and Kendrick Nunn was selected to the second team.

Oakland played three exhibition games, defeating Central Michigan, Rochester College and Davenport in games at the O'rena. The 108–88 victory against Central Michigan was a special game to raise money for the American Red Cross and hurricane relief.

Roster
The following table lists Oakland's roster.

Schedule and results
The following is Oakland's schedule.

|-
! colspan=12 style= | Exhibition

|-
! colspan=12 style= | Non-conference regular season

|-
! colspan=12 style= | Horizon League regular season

|-
! colspan=9 style= | Horizon League tournament

Rankings

Oakland received 19 points in the preseason Coaches Poll and 2 points in the AP Poll. USA Today named the Golden Grizzlies a team that was "snubbed" by not being ranked in the preseason Top 25.

The team was also ranked No. 5 in the preseason Collegeinsider.com Mid-Major Top 25.

References

External links
 Official site
 Team statistics

Oakland Golden Grizzlies men's basketball seasons
Oakland
Oakland Golden Grizzlies men's basketball
Oakland Golden Grizzlies men's basketball